Pyaasa  is a 2002 Indian Hindi-language film directed by A. Muthu. The film tells the story of Suraj (Aftab Shivdasani), a young man, full of dreams, aspirations, desire, but no money. He is desperate for money. He meets the anchor of his life, Sheetal Oberoi (Yukta Mookhey in her first major leading role in Hindi cinema), boss of a Mega Corporate company, who has a lot of money with her.

Plot
Pyaasa is a love triangle with revenge as its base. Suraj (Aftab) aspires to be a millionaire some day, but all hopes of making it big are squashed by his father, (Govind Namdeo) and uncle (Anang Desai), who don't approve of selling their ancestral land. Sheetal (Yukta Mookhey), a tycoon, hires Suraj to work for her business empire. Prem (Zulfi Syed) is Suraj's cousin and an accomplished businessman, who Suraj detests. What Suraj does not know is that Sheetal is just using him as a pawn to exact revenge from Prem and his father, Dharam Thakur (Anang Desai). How Suraj faces up to Sheetal and thwarts her motives forms the rest of the story.

Cast
Aftab Shivdasani as Suraj Thakur
Yukta Mookhey as Sheetal Oberoi
Zulfi Syed as Prem Thakur
Anang Desai as Dharam Thakur
Akhilendra Mishra as Mr. Oberoi
Govind Namdeo as Mr. Thakur
Saadhika as Simran Thakur
Smita Jaykar as Mrs. Thakur
Arif Zakaria
Mukesh Tiwari
Sanjay Narvekar
Sardool Sikander in a special appearance
Satyavrat Mudgal as Aftab's Friend

Soundtrack

References

External links
 

2000s Hindi-language films
2002 films
Films scored by Nikhil-Vinay
Films scored by Anand Raj Anand
Films scored by Daboo Malik
Films scored by Sanjeev Darshan

de:Pyaasa